Thematic investing is a form of investment which aims to identify macro-level trends, and the underlying investments that stand to benefit from the materialisation of those trends.

Definition
The Financial Times describes thematic investing as a broad term with a meaning which can differ depending on the audience. Frances Hudson, strategist for multi-asset investing at Standard Life Investments, says: “It tends to be global [and] it can be multi-asset, although within wealth management it is primarily equities. The manager will pick things they think are important, so it might be the emergence of emerging markets, something changing about technology, or an aspect of the environment, such as water shortages.”
According to Charles Richardson, manager of the Veritas Global Equity Income fund, the benefits include “formulation of strategic context, getting behind future tailwinds, narrowing the universe, and focusing further research while avoiding spot forecasting or market timing.”

Jan Luthman, co-manager of the Liontrust Macro Equity Income fund, said “Today’s macro themes are both unprecedented and powerful. Major themes such as globalisation, population ageing and environmental change have significant implications for economies and businesses. Structuring a portfolio so it fits with the forces that are reshaping national and international economies allows it to ‘sail with the wind’; ignoring or misinterpreting these themes can condemn a fund to perpetually sailing against unseen and misunderstood tides.”

Comparison with other forms of investing
Though similar to sector investing, thematic funds tend to cover a variety of sectors and pick companies within these sectors that are relevant to the theme. Thus a health care fund might invest in pharmaceutical companies, hospital companies, health insurance companies, nursing homes, surgical equipment manufacturers and hi-tech and infotech companies that support any of the former.

In times of extreme stress the world's major equity markets can all react and fall in unison. For example, a correlation of 1 means markets rise and fall perfectly in tandem, and between 2007 and 2010 the correlations between major equity markets (with the exception of Japan) ranged from 0.77 to 0.99. So a portfolio diversified along geographical lines might not always provide variation at these times. Allocating equity growth portions of portfolios along the lines of themes rather than geographies can counter this. 

Thematic investing involves creating a portfolio (or portion of a portfolio) by gathering together a collection of companies involved in certain areas that you predict will generate above-market returns over the long term. Themes can be based on a concept such as ageing populations or a sub-sector such as robotics.

Usually, mutual funds have between 40-80 stocks in a portfolio and because of the high diversification in investments, returns are often much lower than the potential. In thematic investing, in contrast, usually fewer stocks are selected for the portfolio, more focused on a key area. If that area performs well, returns will be much higher than what mutual funds typically deliver.  

Fidelity Investments describes thematic investing as controversial, claiming that advocates say it is an effective strategy because it “concentrates securities in an idea that is still misunderstood and underappreciated in the marketplace. Those companies involved in the theme will exhibit better-than-average returns as more investors realize their potential and money is moved into that sector”, while suggesting that critics see these types of strategies as “marketing ploys designed to attract fast money from the public rather than as viable long-term investments. Those critics say the funds harm investors by encouraging them to chase the latest fad, usually too late.”

Core areas

Some core areas in thematic investing include:

Investor access and take-up
Social trading platforms offer investors easy access to thematic investment providing exposure to portfolios in areas such as technology, cryptoassets, renewable energy, gaming companies, banks, genome engineering and others. 

In April 2020, thematic funds have reached €112bn in asset under management. In Europe, total assets in thematic exchange-traded funds (ETFs) were just under €7 Billion in November 2018. The five largest ETFs account for 73% of total thematic ETF assets. The top two, iShares Automation & Robotics ETF (RBOT) and L&G ROBO Global Robotics and Automation ETF (ROBO), account for almost half. 

In November 2018, the UK's Investment Association proposed the inclusion of ETFs, including thematic EFTs, in its sectors. As of June 2019, 13 U.S.-listed thematic ETFs held more than US$1 billion in assets and another nine held more than US$500 million. In Canada, no Canadian-listed thematic ETF holds more than $500 million, with the fund category holding about $2.5 billion as of January 2020.

As of August 2021 there were 65 water funds holding $35 billion in assets under management.

References

Investment